Fahad Khamis Rashid Al-Jalabubi (born 14 August 1990), commonly known as Fahad Al-Jalabubi, is an Omani footballer who plays for Saham SC in Oman Professional League.

Club career
On 21 July 2013, he signed a one-year contract with Saham SC.  On 9 July 2014, he agreed a one-year contract extension with Saham SC.

Club career statistics

International career
Fahad is part of the first team squad of the Oman national football team. He was selected for the national team for the first time in 2010. He made his first appearance for Oman on 11 August 2010 in a friendly match against Kazakhstan. He has made appearances in the 2014 FIFA World Cup qualification and the 2015 AFC Asian Cup qualification.

Honours

Club
With Al-Suwaiq
Omani League (2): 2010–11, 2012–13
Sultan Qaboos Cup (1): 2012
Omani Super Cup (1): 2013; Runner-Up 2011

References

External links
 
 
 
 
 

1990 births
Living people
Omani footballers
Oman international footballers
Association football defenders
Al-Khabourah SC players
Suwaiq Club players
Saham SC players
Oman Professional League players